The Ford Ruhr (type G388T) is a truck model that Ford Germany manufactured together with its larger sister model Ford Rhein between 1948 and 1958.

The new truck came as a successor to the Ford V-3000S and was almost exactly the same. It had an in-line four-cylinder gasoline engine with a displacement of 3285 cm³, which developed 52 hp (38 kW). The engine power was passed on to the rear wheels via a four- or five-speed gearbox. All-wheel drive was also available on request.

The trucks were usually delivered from the factory with an all-steel driver's cab in gray and a flatbed. The wheelbase was 4013 mm, the payload 3000 kg. From 1952, there were also vehicles with a wheelbase shortened to 3404 mm, with a payload of only 1500 or 2000 kg. They were offered as "express trucks".

The Ruhr was only available with a gasoline engine. Even the competitors only partially offered diesel engines, and gasoline engines could also be equipped with wood gasifiers, thus countering the fuel shortage of the post-war period. Later on, gasoline engines were a decisive disadvantage because they consume significantly more fuel (around 17 L/100 km) than similarly powerful diesel engines.

The successor, the FK 2500, was equipped with two-stroke diesel engines.

References

Ruhr
Ruhr
Vehicles introduced in 1948
Trucks of Germany